John Knauf (April 5, 1868 – September 19, 1952) was an American judge who served as a justice of the Supreme Court of North Dakota in 1906. He was first appointed to the court in 1906 after justice Newton C. Young resigned, and he did not win re-election later that year, making his tenure of four and one half months on the court the shortest in North Dakota history. He died in Fargo, North Dakota in 1952 at age 84.

Early life and education
Knauf was born in Waterloo, Michigan on April 5, 1868. When he was young, his parents died and along with his brothers and sisters he moved to Stutsman County, North Dakota in 1883. Knauf was educated in the school system of Jamestown, North Dakota. For higher education, he spent one year at Jamestown College and one year at St. John's University in Collegeville, Minnesota before enrolling at the University of Michigan School of Law where he received a law degree in 1892.

Legal and judicial career
After receiving his law degree, Knauf was admitted to practice law in the state of Michigan. He was admitted to the North Dakota Bar in 1893 and thereafter opened a legal office in Jamestown. While in Jamestown, he served for a time as a Stutsman County judge.

In 1906, a 38-year-old Knauf was appointed to the North Dakota Supreme Court, filling the seat vacated by the retirement of Newton C. Young. Knauf was defeated in the general election to a full term in the seat later that year.

After leaving the Supreme Court, Knauf returned to private legal practice in Jamestown. He died on September 19, 1952 at the age of 84.

External links
North Dakota Supreme Court biography

References

Justices of the North Dakota Supreme Court
1868 births
1952 deaths
People from Jamestown, North Dakota
University of Michigan Law School alumni
People from Jackson County, Michigan